Thomas Williams (died 24 April 1877) was a Welsh Anglican priest in the mid-nineteenth century.

Williams was born at Llanvapley and educated at Oriel College, Oxford. He held incumbencies at Llanddewi Skirrid then Llanvapley from 1859 to 1880. He was Archdeacon of Llandaff from 1843 to 1857 and Dean of Llandaff from 1857 until 1877.

References 

1877 deaths
Archdeacons of Llandaff
Deans of Llandaff
Alumni of Oriel College, Oxford